Whoville, sometimes written as Who-ville, is a fictional town created by author Theodor Seuss Geisel, under the name Dr. Seuss.  Whoville appeared in the 1954 book Horton Hears a Who! and the 1957 book How the Grinch Stole Christmas! with significant differences between the two renditions. Its denizens go by the collective name Whos, as in a plural form of the pronoun who.

Setting
According to the book Horton Hears a Who!, the city of Whoville is located within a floating speck of dust which is then placed onto a clover flower by Horton the Elephant. In the book How the Grinch Stole Christmas, the location of Whoville is never mentioned; geographic references include the mentioning of a several thousand-foot tall "Mount Crumpit", and an overlook just north of the city where the titular Grinch resides. In the 1977 television special Halloween Is Grinch Night, which implies that the overlook is located on Mount Crumpit, additional geographic features are added to Whoville such as Punkers Pond, where sea monsters known as Hakken-Kraks (an apparent play on the legendary kraken, and reference to one of the many creatures from his book 'Oh The Places You'll Go') reside. Again, however, its greater location is not mentioned.

In the 1970s television special  Horton Hears a Who! as well as the 2008 CGI-animated film of the same name, Whoville retains its literary location being within a speck on a clover flower. The 1966 television special  How the Grinch Stole Christmas also stays true of the literature.

In the 2000 live-action film adaptation  Dr. Seuss' How the Grinch Stole Christmas, from Universal Pictures and Imagine Entertainment, Whoville is located inside a snowflake, south of Mt. Crumpit within the mountainous High range of Pontoos, described in the film's introduction. As the story takes place in the winter, the speck on which Whoville has landed is now on a snowflake instead of a clover, which would be out of season.

Because the city of Whoville resides on a speck, the Whoville depicted in 2008 film is prone to unexpected movement and weather and may from time to time change location altogether, a major plot point in the film.

Inhabitants
Many of the different characters, known as Whos, live within the speck that contains Whoville. The Whos are whimsical, animal-like creatures who live in shaped houses, known for their warm hearts and welcoming spirits. They are small, furry humanoids with canine snouts and 12 toes. As they celebrate Christmas and readily recognize its true meaning in the absence of material gifts, it is implied to be a majority Christian community; Seuss had gone through several attempts at a more explicitly Christian ending to How the Grinch Stole Christmas! but, dissatisfied in the idea of a heavy-handed approach, decided to leave the religious aspects implied. In the live-action film, however, the Whos resemble ordinary people with large ears, buck-teeth and strange hairstyles, and while the Who children have ordinary human noses, the adult Whos' noses are snout shaped. Also, they are shown to be very greedy and materialistic as compared to the book version. Just north of Whoville, atop a high mountain, Mount Crumpit, a bitter, cave-dwelling creature named the Grinch lives with his dog, Max.

Cindy Lou Who is a generous young girl who was introduced in the book How the Grinch Stole Christmas! In the 2000 live-action film, How the Grinch Stole Christmas she is played by actress Taylor Momsen.

The Grinch is a fictional, green-colored creature with a cat-like face and a cynical personality. He lives in isolation on Mt. Crumpet with his dog Max. The Grinch overlooks the city of Whoville with a lack of empathy for all Whos. He is known to be of a different species than the Whos, being stated as a What in the 2000 film. The Grinch is played by actor Jim Carrey in the 2000 production of How the Grinch Stole Christmas!

In the book Horton Hears a Who, there is a mayor in Whoville. In the live-action film How the Grinch Stole Christmas, there is a mayor named Augustus May Who, played by Jeffrey Tambor. Actor Steve Carell voices the Mayor of Whoville in the 2008 animated film Horton Hears a Who. In this version, he is named Ned McDodd, and he lives with his wife, 96 daughters, and one son named Jo-Jo. There are differences between May and McDodd that are instantly noticeable: May is a pompous, arrogant man who views himself as the only person worth listening to, whereas McDodd is "devoted, and fair and a little bit odd".

Adaptations

Books
Dr. Seuss created two children's books introducing readers to the magical world of Whoville. His first story, Horton Hears a Who was published in 1954. His second use of Whoville was in the story How the Grinch Stole Christmas published in 1957.

Broadway
Seussical, is a Broadway musical produced by Lynn Ahrens and Stephen Flaherty in 2000. The musical is a collection of Dr. Seuss's most famous stories that were combined to represent a synthesis of his work. The majority of the musical centers around the life in Whoville, especially the Whos' Christmas pageant and Horton the elephant. Both themes were based on the plots of How the Grinch Stole Christmas! and Horton Hears a Who!

Theme parks
Universal Orlando Resort endorses Dr. Seuss's work by attributing a section of the amusement park to him. Within the Islands of Adventure, there is a component designated to the city of Whoville. In the town, visitors of Universal Orlando Resort can interact with the characters and explore the theme park.

Films and television
The television program How the Grinch Stole Christmas! was a 26-minute special originally telecast on CBS in 1966. In 2000 How the Grinch Stole Christmas was developed into a motion picture, which became the first Dr. Seuss story ever made into a featured film. Also, Horton Hears a Who was adapted into a 26-minute television segment in 1970. In 2008, Horton Hears a Who! was made into a full-length film. A CGI adaptation called The Grinch was released in 2018. In the Netflix adaptation of Green Eggs and Ham, Whoville is referred to in the pilot episode "Here". Guy-Am-I reads a newspaper and one article regarding "Who Were You in Whoville?". Additionally, Whoville was referred to as "Newville" in the 2022 horror film adaptation The Mean One, based on How the Grinch Stole Christmas!.

References

Fictional elements introduced in 1954
Dr. Seuss
The Grinch (franchise)
Fictional populated places